Drug trade may refer to:
 Legal drug trade, the manufacture and sale of pharmaceutical drugs
 Illegal drug trade, the manufacture and sale of illicit psychoactive substances
 Pharmaceutical industry, the manufacture and sale of medical treatment chemicals
 Drug distribution, the logistics of delivering drugs from the manufacturer to the consumer

See also
 Legality of drugs (disambiguation)  Legality of drugs